An Ordinary Day (also called Chapter 6) is the sixth album of the South Korean pop music group g.o.d. It was released in December 2004, nearly two years after their previous album. In between, member Yoon Kye-sang had left the group and pursued acting. The album was their first release as a quartet and since switching from Sidus to JYP Entertainment.

Overview
The album's overall theme is centered around first love, heartbreak and loss. The songs are largely pop or R&B but feature a more diverse array of genres. The Korean-language pop culture website Star News noted that the album showed more of each member's individuality and unique singing and rapping styles compared to their past albums.

Reception
"An Ordinary Day" and "The Reason Why Opposites Attract" won first place on the music programs Inkigayo and Music Camp (the former incarnation of Show! Music Core), with the latter song winning a Triple Crown on Inkigayo.

In popular culture
In 2005, "An Ordinary Day" (보통날) and "Promise" (약속) were chosen as default tunes installed in LG Cyon's 340 series cellular phones. "An Ordinary Day" was chosen by the g.o.d members as the song to be remade for their 2014 reunion album Chapter 8. Original composer Kwon Tae-eun rearranged the song and added a part for Yoon Kye-sang.

In 2014 HyunA's song "From When and Until When" (어디부터 어디까지), which she co-wrote with labelmate Hyunsik of BtoB, attracted attention and some controversy when listeners realized that several lines were exactly the same as the lyrics of the song "The Reason Why Opposites Attract" (반대가 끌리는 이유). HyunA and Hyunsik later admitted that they had intentionally incorporated the lyrics as a fan homage to g.o.d's 15th anniversary reunion that year and apologized for failing to inform songwriter Park Jin-young and the g.o.d members.

Track listing
All lyrics and music is written and composed by Park Jin-young, except where noted.

Charts and sales

Monthly charts

Year-end charts

Sales

See also
JYP Entertainment discography

References

External links
Album Information  – Mnet 
An Ordinary Day on iTunes

2004 albums
G.o.d albums
JYP Entertainment albums
Korean-language albums